Ankama is a French entertainment company headquartered in Roubaix, France, focused on the design of massive multiplayer online role playing games (Dofus, Dofus Arena and Wakfu). The company is also active in publishing, animation and Web development. The company name comes from their own names : ANthony, KAmille, MAnu.

Video games 

 create, produce and distribute their own video games:

 Dofus, the first game by the studio, is an MMORPG developed entirely in Flash. Players control an Avatar in the medieval fantasy "World of Twelve". aiming to acquire experience by completing quests and defeating monsters. The game uses a unique, turn based tactical combat system, which sets Dofus apart from many other MMORPGs. The basic version of the game is free-to-play, but more features are available to player purchasing a subscription.
 Dofus Arena, which public beta-testing began in early 2006, is the PvP (Player versus player) version of Dofus. The players take on the role of a coach setting up a team to compete with the teams of other players. Dofus Arena takes its combat system from Dofus. The goal of the game is to go up a relative ranking of players, which is based on the Elo rating system.
Voya Nui Online Game, the only known game developed by Ankama to be used by another company (the aforementioned Lego Group), is a one-player RPG that could be played from Lego's website in 2006.
 Islands of Wakfu, an action-adventure role-playing game for the Xbox 360 Xbox Live Arcade published by Microsoft Games Studios, set in the universe of Wakfu. Released in 2011.
 Wakfu, an MMORPG developed in 2011. It allows players to interact without any NPC interference. The game takes place in the same world as Dofus, but is set 1000 years later.
 , is a puzzle platformer released on 9 November 2012.
  is a multi-player video game released in 2015.
  is a single player phone app released in 2015.
 
 Nindash
 
 
  (project)

Comic book publishing 

 was set up in 2006 to publish comic books. Published works include:
 Artbooks Dofus
  manga
 Original SoundTrack Dofus
  comic book (bd)
  comic book (bd)
  manga
 , comic book (bd)
 Dofus Monster manga
 Kuma-kuma manga
 Chaosland comic book (bd)
 Artbook Café Salé
 
 Debaser manga
 Freaks Squeele comic book (bd)
 Kanvict comic book (bd)
 Radiant manga

Web 
Ankama Web is an interactive communication agency specialized in digital media, Web development and marketing buzz strategies. Ankama Web thus develops websites and Internet applications for professionals. Created in 2001, the agency was historically the first pole of activity of Ankama.

Press 
Ankama Presse, dedicated to the publication of magazines, was created on June 15, 2007, as a part of Ankama's cross-media strategy. It published mainly magazines about Ankama's video games. Its main product was Dofus Mag, focused on Ankama's flagship game, Dofus. The magazine's format was inspired by the Japanese concept of mook, indicating a hybrid product between magazine and book: while being distributed in newsstands, it was meant to be read and preserved as a book. Dofus Mag and other Ankama Presse titles were subsequently canceled.

Animation 

 was created in March 2007. MadLab Animations was created in 2017.

In 2008, Wakfu: The Animated Series (based on the video game, Wakfu) began airing. A second season aired in 2010. Both seasons consisted of 26 20-minute episodes. The plot focuses on Yugo and his companions as he is looking for his biological family. The series was animated in Adobe Flash.

In 2013, Dofus: The Treasures of Kerubim, based upon the Dofus game, aired. The series is set 200 years before the beginning of the MMORPG. It follows the main character Kerubim throughout various episodes of his life. The premise has Kerubim narrating several of his adventures to his adopted son Joris and their housekeeper Simone. The series consists of 52 10-minute episodes. A movie adaptation of the TV series is slated to release in late 2015.

In 2016, the film  (Jean-Jacques Denis) was released in French theaters.

In 2018, the film Mutafukaz (Shōjirō Nishimi) was released in French theaters. On December 25, 2019 it was released on Netflix in the US market.

Development strategy

Internationally 
Ankama developed internationally from the 2000s with two subsidiaries in the United States and Japan, and expanded with the arrival of Olivier Comte as general manager and the creation of many other studios.

Ankama Studio is a subsidiary of Ankama, created in 2006, which produces games for other companies, particularly in North America. The Ankama Japan studio, based in Tokyo, opened in early 2009. It mainly deals with animation.

Based in Montreal, the Ankama Canada studio was created on August 1, 2013 by two Ankama employees. The group, made up of ten employees, is the author of the video game Abraca. To enable (among other things) the expansion of the Wakfu game in China, the company opened a studio in Singapore in early 2014. These two studios, as well as another in São Paulo in Brazil, will close quickly, to allow Ankama to focus on Japan and Paris.

The Ankama Asia group, based in Manila in the Philippines, and aiming to develop its games in the Asian world, was acquired on March 22, 2016 by Keywords Studios. During this four-year contract, Keywords wishes to recruit about twenty more employees.

In 2018, Studio No Border was created, a Tokyo subsidiary responsible for the development of Japanese animations and video games. Thomas Romain, known for his Code Lyoko series, is the artistic director.

In 2019, Ankama reached the twelfth rank of the most profitable French companies.

References

External links 
 

Companies based in Hauts-de-France
Film production companies of France
French animation studios
French brands
French companies established in 2001
Magazine publishing companies of France
Publishing companies of France
Software companies of France
Video game companies established in 2001
Video game companies of France